The 2018 United Women's Soccer season is the 24th season of pro-am women's soccer in the United States, and the third season of the UWS league.

Changes from 2017 
 Connecticut Fusion and Worcester Smiles joined the league and were placed in the East Conference.
 Lansing United and Genesee FC joined the league and were placed in the Midwest Conference.
 LA Galaxy OC and Colorado Pride joined the league and were placed in the West Conference.
 ASA El Paso, FC Austin Elite, HAR FC, and North Texas Image joined the league and with the Houston Aces were placed in the newly formed Southwest Conference.
 New York Magic, FC Indiana, and Toledo Villa FC left the league.

Standings

East Conference

Midwest Conference

Southwest Conference

West Conference

Playoffs

East Conference Playoffs 

Bold = winner* = after extra time, = penalty shootout score

Midwest Conference Playoffs 
Hosted by Lansing United in East Lansing, Michigan

Bold = winner* = after extra time, = penalty shootout score

National Playoffs 
Hosted by Grand Rapids FC at Grandville High School in Grandville, Michigan.

Bold = winner* = after extra time, = penalty shootout score

Semifinals

UWS Championship

Championship MVP: Julie Gavorski (Houston Aces)

Statistical leaders

Top scorers 

Source:

Top assists 

Source:

|}

League awards

Individual Awards
Player of the Year: Brooke Barbuto (ROC)
Offensive Player of the Year: Haley Crawford (INF)
Defensive Player of the Year: Natalie Jacobs (LAG)
Coach of the Year: Troye Flannery (CAL)

All-League First Team
F: Gisela Arrieta (HOU), Haley Crawford (INF), Carissima Cutrona (WNY)
M: Brooke Barbuto (ROC), Dani Evans (DET), Jessica Jones (CAL), Tesa McKibben (INF)
D: Natalie Jacobs (LAG), Kylee McIntosh (CON),  Olivia Trombley (LAN)
G: Kelly O’Brien (INF)

All-League Second Team
F: Julie Gavorski (HOU), Kate Howarth (NEM), Tori Sousa (CON)
M: Sabrina Flores (LAG), Grace Labadie (GRA), Teresa Rook (INF),  Riko Sagara (LAN)
D: Athena Biondi (LAN), Grace Stordy (CAL), Aubrey Suydam (INF)
G: Stephanie Labbé (CAL)

References

External links 

 
2018
1